Jalfrezi (Bengali: ঝালফ্রেজী; also jhal frezi, jaffrazi, and many other alternative spellings) is a stir-fried curry dish originating in Bengal and popular throughout the Indian subcontinent and beyond. Jalfrezi means "hot-fry". It consists of a main ingredient such as meat, fish, paneer or vegetables, stir-fried and served in a thick spicy sauce that includes green chilli peppers. Common further ingredients include bell peppers, onions and tomatoes.

History 
Jalfrezi recipes appeared in cookbooks of British India as a way of using up leftovers by frying them with chilli and onion. This English-language usage derived from the colloquial Bengali term jhāl porhezī: jhāl means spicy food; porhezī means suitable for a diet. Jalfrezi is usually prepared by stir-frying ingredients, a technique introduced to the region by Chinese cuisine.

Preparation 
Jalfrezi is typically made from green peppers, onions, and tomatoes. Additional ingredients include spices like paprika and coriander. Vegetables or meat are then stir-fried into the mix. Jalfrezi is often served alongside pulao.

Popularity
In a survey in 2011, jalfrezi was rated the most popular dish in UK Indian and broader South Asian restaurants.

References

Bangladeshi cuisine
Indian curries
South Asian curries
Indian Chinese cuisine
Pakistani chicken dishes
Bengali cuisine
Pakistani curries